Lurleen may refer to:

 Lurleen Wallace (1926-1968), Governor of Alabama and wife of George Wallace
 Lurleen Lumpkin, a recurring character on The Simpsons television series

See also

Lurlene, given name
 Lurline (disambiguation)